Aa is a Scandinavian surname. Notable people with the surname include:

 Brynjar Aa (born 1960), Norwegian dramatist
 Terje Aa (born 1961), Norwegian bridge player

See also
Van der Aa (surname)
Anuel AA (born 1992), stage name of Puerto Rican singer/rapper Emmanuel Gazmey Santiago

Surnames of Scandinavian origin